Dauner is a surname. Notable people with the surname include:

Charles Dauner (1912–1993), American handball player
Marvin Dauner (1927–2010), American farmer and politician
Wolfgang Dauner (1935–2020), German jazz pianist

See also 
Dauner–Akkon, German UCI Continental team founded in 2017